Where My Dogs At? is an American adult animated television series created by Aaron Matthew Lee and Jeff Ross that aired on MTV2 as part of its Sic'emation lineup. The series aired from June 10 to July 29, 2006.

Plot
The show revolves around Buddy, a beagle separated from his 10-year-old owner Jeffy in Elizabeth, New Jersey, and Woof, a large bulldog (to whom Buddy refers as obsessed) who runs away from his owner. Both canines try to survive in the streets of Hollywood and avoid conflict with the Dog Catcher. The show lampoons celebrity stardom in various ways;  for example, many of the characters based on real celebrities have other voice actors impersonating their voices (such as Steve-O from Jackass and Wildboyz, who appeared in the third episode).  The animation for the show was produced at 6 Point Harness.

Cast
 Jeff Ross as Buddy
 Tracy Morgan as Woof
 John DiMaggio as Dog Catcher, Additional Voices
 Greg Eagles as Additional Voices
 Dean Edwards as Additional Voices
 Aaron Matthew Lee as Additional Voices
 Jeff Richards as Rexia, Additional Voices
 Lauren Tom as Additional Voices

Episodes

Reception
Leonard Pitts of the Miami Herald said that "MTV misses mark with offensive 'woofie' cartoon."

Controversy
MTV and the show received angry responses from the African-American community for "depicting black women squatting on all fours tethered to leashes and defecating on the floor" in an episode depicting Snoop Dogg ("Woofie Loves Snoop").

References

External links

2006 American television series debuts
2006 American television series endings
2000s American adult animated television series
2000s American animated comedy television series
2000s American sitcoms
American adult animated comedy television series
American animated sitcoms
American flash adult animated television series
Animated television series about dogs
English-language television shows
Animation controversies in television
Obscenity controversies in animation
Obscenity controversies in television
Television controversies in the United States
MTV cartoons
MTV2 original programming
Television shows set in California